Ferdinand Julius Fagerlin (5 February 1825 - 19 March 1907) was a Swedish-German genre painter.

Biography
Born in Stockholm, Fagerlin first apprenticed as a shipbuilder (1842–1843) before attending the Royal Swedish Academy of Arts (1845–1847). He joined the army (1850–1854) and practiced painting, particularly portraits. From 1854 on he dedicated himself completely to painting and with the support of his former teachers studied at the Kunstakademie Düsseldorf, with Karl Ferdinand Sohn und Friedrich Wilhelm Schadow (1854–1855). He spent time in Paris (1856-1858), where he worked in the shop of Thomas Couture.

On his return to Düsseldorf in 1958, he settled as a painter and married Alice (1844–1931), daughter of painter Henry Ritter (1816-1853) whose shop he inherited after the latter's death in 1853. From 1862 to 1902 he was a member of the Düsseldorf art society, Malkasten. The Swedish painter Axel Kulle was his student from 1875 to 1880.

After 1863, he traveled frequently to the Netherlands, and the imagery he acquired there, particularly of the Dutch coast and the life of its sailors and inhabitants became formative in his genre painting. In 1867 he showed Der Heiratsantrag and Die Eifersucht at the International Exposition in Paris. He died  in Düsseldorf six weeks after his 82nd birthday.

Notable works

 Die angehenden Raucher (Nationalmuseum Stockholm), 
 Die Eifersucht (Nationalmuseum Stockholm), 
 Die Liebeserklärung, 
 Der Heiratsantrag, 
 Die Krankenstube, 
 Der verschmähte Freier,
 Die Genesende (Häusliche Andacht), 1867 (Nationalmuseum Stockholm)

Selected works

References

Further reading 
 Axel Gauffin: Ferdinand Fagerlin (1825-1907). Norstedt, Stockholm 1910.
 : Die Düsseldorfer Malerschule. Philipp von Zabern, Mainz 1979, .

1825 births
1907 deaths
Swedish painters
Swedish male painters
Genre painters
19th-century German painters
19th-century German male artists
German male painters
Artists from Stockholm
Düsseldorf school of painting